Andrew Scott Dolkart is a professor of Historic Preservation at the Columbia University Graduate School of Architecture, Planning and Preservation (GSAPP) and the former Director of the school's Historic Preservation Program. Professor Dolkart is an authority on the preservation of historically significant architecture and an expert in the architecture and development of New York City. He was described as someone who is "without peer among New York's architectural researchers" by architectural critic Francis Morrone and he has written extensively on this topic. Before joining the faculty at Columbia he held a position at the New York City Landmarks Preservation Commission and worked as a consultant. Dolkart holds a Bachelor of Arts degree from Colgate University (1973) and a Master of Science degree in Historic Preservation from Columbia University (1977); he is a popular lecturer and walking tour guide.

Historic preservation

In an interview with the Columbia Daily Spectator Dolkart recalled that he first became interested in Historic Preservation in his first year of graduate studies in Art History. Dolkart has had a continuous presence in the preservation field in New York since he graduated from the Historic Preservation program at Columbia in 1977.  In 2014 he received the Historic District Council's Landmarks Lion award.   He has authored many of the New York City Landmarks Preservation Commission's reports and served as an editor for the first edition of the Guide to New York City Landmarks.
In 2008 he was named Director of the program in Historic Preservation at Columbia University, a position previously held by James Marston Fitch (1964–1977), Robert A.M. Stern, and Paul Spencer Byard (1998–2008). In 2009 he was awarded tenure, becoming the second tenured Director in the history of the Historic Preservation program. He served as director until 2016. Along with Jay Shockley and Ken Lustbader, Dolkart is a founding member of the NYC LGBT Historic Sites Project, begun in 2015. He is currently a Project Director.

Philosophy

In his teaching and writing Dolkart stresses the importance of Vernacular architecture based more on commercial need than strictly stylistic preferences.  Much of his work emphasizes the practical and economic aspects of buildings, whether they were constructed to meet the needs of the garment industry, tenement housing, or high-end housing designed primarily to meet the profit objectives of speculative real estate developers. His presentation style uses humor and irony: "I trace my ancestry back to the Mayflower," Dolkart writes in the forward to Biography of a Tenement House in New York City: An Architectural History of 97 Orchard Street. "Not to the legendary ship that brought the Pilgrims to Plymouth, Massachusetts, in 1620, but to the more prosaic tenement on the southeast corner of East Broadway and Clinton Street named the Mayflower, where my father was born in 1914 to Russian-Jewish immigrants." On its webpage describing Dolkart's book, a staff writer from the  Lower East Side Tenement Museum states, "For Dolkart, the experience of being raised in a tenement became a metaphor for the life that was afforded countless thousands of other immigrant children growing up in Lower Manhattan during the past century and more. Dolkart presents for us a precise and informative biography of a typical tenement house in New York City that became, in 1988, the site for the Lower East Side Tenement Museum...This book is a lasting tribute to the legacy of immigrants and their children, who were part of the transformation of New York City and the fabric of everyday American urban life." In 2009, Dolkart published "The Row House Reborn: Architecture and Neighborhoods in New York City, 1909-1929," a pioneering study of the rediscovery and redesign of run-down urban row houses in the early 20th century and the creation of an entirely new type of urban housing. This award-winning book is both an investigation of this important movement in New York real estate and housing history and an advocacy piece seeking an appreciation for and preservation of these houses.

Prizes and awards
 Historic Districts Council's Landmarks Lion award
 Society of Architectural Historians, Antoinette Forrester Downing Award for "The Row House Reborn," 2012.
 New York City Book Awards, Architectural History Award for "The Row House Reborn," 2010.
 Victorian Society in America, Metropolitan Chapter, Architectural History Award for "The Row House Reborn," 2010.
 New York City Book Awards, Cultural History Award for "Biography of a Tenement House in New York City," 2007.
 Metropolitan Chapter of the Victorian Society in America. Special Citation for "Biography of a Tenement House in New York City," 2007.
 Historic Districts Council, Grass Roots Preservation Award. Awarded for advocacy in the preservation of the Thomson Meter Company Building, Brooklyn. 2004.
 Lower Hudson Conference of Historical Agencies and Museums. Award for Excellence in archival-based scholarship, 2002, for "Central Synagogue in Its Changing Neighborhood."
 Victorian Society in America New York Chapter.  Award for contributions to the preservation of New York’s Victorian built environment, 1999.
 Winner, Association of American Publishers's 1998 Award for Excellence in Professional/Scholarly Publishing, Best Book in Architecture and Urban Planning for "Morningside Heights: A History of its Architecture and Development."

Selected publications
 “Fifty Years of Landmarking,” in Donald Albrect and Andrew S. Dolkart, eds., "Saving Place: 50 Years of New York City Landmarks" (Museum of the City of New York and Monacelli Press, 2015).
 “Designing Woodlawn: Architecture and Landscapes,” in "Sylvan Cemetery: Architecture, Art & Landscape at Woodlawn" (Avery Library and Woodlawn Cemetery, 2014).
 The Row House Reborn: Architecture and Neighborhoods in New York City, 1908-1929 (Johns Hopkins University Press, 2009).
 Biography of a Tenement House in New York City: An Architectural History of 97 Orchard Street (University of Virginian Press, 2006).
 Morningside Heights: A History of Its Architecture and Development (Columbia University Press, 1998).
 Guide to New York City Landmarks (1992; expanded and updated, John Wiley, 1998, 2003)

Full list of publications
 “Tenements” and “City and Suburban Homes Company” in Nicholas Dagen Bloom and Matthew Gordon Lasner, "Affordable Housing in New York" (Princeton University Press, 2015).
 “Fifty Years of Landmarking,” in Donald Albrect and Andrew S. Dolkart, eds., "Saving Place: 50 Years of New York City Landmarks* (Museum of the City of New York and Monacelli Press, 2015).
 "Designing Woodlawn: Buildings and Landscapes," (in Sylvan Cemetery: Architecture, Art & Landscape at Woodlawn, 2014).
 "Designing Green-Wood Cemetery,” in "Green-Wood at 175" (2013).
 “The Fabric of New York City’s Garment District: Architecture and Development in an Urban Cultural Landscape,” Buildings and Landscapes (spring 2011).
 “From Rag Trade to Riches: Abraham E. Lefcourt Builds the Garment District” (in Rebecca Kobrin, ed., Chosen Capital: The Jewish Encounter with American Capitalism,  2012).
 The Row House Reborn: Architecture and Neighborhoods in New York City, 1908-1929 (Johns Hopkins University Press, 2009).
 Biography of a Tenement House in New York City: An Architectural History of 97 Orchard Street (University of Virginian Press, 2006).
 "Millionaires Elysiums: The Luxury Apartment Hotels of Schultze & Weaver," Journal of Decorative and Propaganda Arts (forthcoming spring 2005).
 The Carnegie Mansion and the Cooper-Hewitt Museum: The History of a House (Scala/Cooper-Hewitt National Design Museum, 2002).
 Central Synagogue In Its Changing Neighborhood (Central Synagogue, 2002).
 Touring Lower Manhattan: Three Walks in New York’s Historic Downtown (New York Landmarks Conservancy, 2000).
 Morningside Heights: A History of Its Architecture and Development (Columbia University Press, 1998).
 Guide to New York City Landmarks (1992; expanded and updated, John Wiley, 1998, 2003)
 Touring Historic Harlem: Four Walks in Northern Manhattan (New York Landmarks Conservancy, 1997).
 Gramercy: Its Architectural Surroundings (Gramercy Neighborhood Associates, 1996).
 The Dictionary of Art (London: Macmillan, 1996); major entry on the development of New York City and entries on seven architects.
 New Architecture in Brooklyn, 1985-1995 (Rotunda Gallery, 1995).
 Touring the Upper East Side: Walks in Five Historic Districts (New York Landmarks Conservancy, 1995).
 George & Edward Blum: Texture and Design in New York Apartment Buildings, with Susan Tunick (Friends of Terra Cotta, 1993).
 "Homes for People: Non-Profit Cooperatives in New York, 1916-1929," SITES (May 1989); reprinted Cooperative Housing Journal (1993).
 Forging a Metropolis: Walking Tours of Lower Manhattan Architecture (Whitney Museum of American Art, 1990).
 This is Brooklyn: A Guide to Brooklyn's Historic Districts and Landmarks (Fund for the Borough of Brooklyn, 1990).
 The Texture of Tribeca (Tribeca Community Association, 1989).
 Downtown Brooklyn Walking Tours (Fund for the Borough of Brooklyn, 1989).
 Living the Dream: City and Suburban's York Avenue Estate (Coalition to Save City and Suburban Homes, 1988).
 "Hudson View Gardens: A Home in the City," SITES (May 1988).
 Lower Manhattan Architectural Survey (Lower Manhattan Cultural Council, 1987).

See also
 Architecture of New York City
 LGBT culture in New York City
 List of LGBT people from New York City

References

American architectural historians
American male non-fiction writers
Columbia University faculty
Columbia Graduate School of Architecture, Planning and Preservation faculty
Colgate University alumni
Living people
Columbia Graduate School of Architecture, Planning and Preservation alumni
Historians from New York (state)
Year of birth missing (living people)
Historians of New York City